Blue Skies  is a studio album of phonograph records by Bing Crosby and Fred Astaire released in 1946 featuring songs that were presented in the American musical film Blue Skies. Like Song Hits from Holiday Inn, the entire 78 rpm album would be composed of Irving Berlin songs written specifically for the film. This was the first release of one of Astaire's greatest songs, "Puttin' On the Ritz", on shellac disc record.

Reception
Down Beat magazine liked it:

The album quickly entered Billboard's album charts reaching the No. 2 spot  and was also ranked No. 20 of the top selling popular record albums for 1947.

Track listing
These newly issued songs were featured on a 5-disc, 78 rpm album set Decca Album No. A-481. The first four discs are sung by Bing Crosby, while the last disc has Bing Crosby and Fred Astaire dueting on "A Couple of Song and Dance Men" and Astaire soloing on "Puttin' On the Ritz".  All music and lyrics by Irving Berlin.

LP release
Eight of the songs were included on the Decca 10" LP Irving Berlin's "Blue Skies" (DL 5042) issued in 1949. The omissions were "A Serenade to an Old-Fashioned Girl" and "Everybody Step".

Side one
 Blue Skies"
 "(I'll See You In) C-U-B-A"
 "You Keep Coming Back Like a Song"
 "Getting Nowhere"
Side two
 "All By Myself"
 "I've Got My Captain Working for Me Now"
 "A Couple of Song and Dance Men"
 "Puttin' On the Ritz"

References

Bing Crosby albums
Fred Astaire albums
1946 albums
Decca Records albums